Navi Mumbai Municipal Transport (NMMT) is the transport wing of Navi Mumbai Municipal Corporation, which operates bus services in Navi Mumbai.

NMMT Routes in Navi Mumbai

References

Municipal transport agencies of India
Companies based in Mumbai
Transport in Navi Mumbai
Transport companies established in 1996
1996 establishments in Maharashtra
Government agencies established in 1996